The 1977 Montana State Bobcats football team was an American football team that represented Montana State University in the Big Sky Conference during the 1977 NCAA Division II football season. In their seventh and final season under head coach Sonny Holland, the Bobcats compiled a 6–4 record (3–3 against Big Sky opponents) and finished third in the Big Sky.

Schedule

References

Montana State
Montana State Bobcats football seasons
Montana State Bobcats football